Jana Aboelhasan (born 29 September 2005) is an Egyptian artistic gymnast.  She was a member of the team who won gold at the 2022 African Championships.  Additionally she represented Egypt at the inaugural Junior World Championships.

Personal life 
Aboelhasan was born in Cairo in 2005.

Gymnastics career

Junior

2018–19
Aboelhasan competed at the African Championships where she helped Egypt place first as a team.  Additionally she placed first on floor exercise.  In September she competed at the Junior Mediterranean Championships where Egypt placed fourth as a team and individually she placed sixth in the all-around, eighth on vault, but won silver on balance beam.

In 2019 Aboelhasan was selected to compete at the inaugural Junior World Championships alongside Jana Mahmoud and Salma Melige; they finished 24th as a team.

Senior

2022
Aboelhasan made her senior international debut at the 2022 Mediterranean Games.  She helped Egypt place sixth as a team.  She next competed at the African Championships where she helped Egypt place first as a team and qualify to the upcoming World Championships.  Individually she placed second in the all-around behind Caitlin Rooskrantz of South Africa, as well as second on balance beam and floor exercise behind compatriots Zeina Ibrahim and Jana Mahmoud respectively.

Competitive history

References

External links
 

2005 births
Living people
Egyptian female artistic gymnasts
Sportspeople from Cairo
Gymnasts at the 2022 Mediterranean Games
21st-century Egyptian women